Nuruzzaman (born 20 October 1994) is a Bangladeshi cricketer who plays for Barisal Division. In September 2017, he scored his maiden first-class century playing for Barisal Division against Khulna Division in the 2017–18 National Cricket League. He made his Twenty20 debut on 3 June 2021, for Brothers Union in the 2021 Dhaka Premier Division Twenty20 Cricket League.

See also
 List of Barisal Division cricketers

References

External links
 

1994 births
Living people
Bangladeshi cricketers
Barisal Division cricketers
Brothers Union cricketers
Place of birth missing (living people)